Ove Flindt Bjerg (born 21 July 1948) is a Danish former professional footballer who played as a midfielder. He made 18 appearances for the Denmark national team from 1970 to 1979.

References

External links
 

1948 births
Living people
Sportspeople from Aalborg
Danish men's footballers
Association football midfielders
Denmark international footballers
Austrian Football Bundesliga players
2. Liga (Austria) players
Bundesliga players
2. Bundesliga players
AaB Fodbold players
FC Wacker Innsbruck players
Karlsruher SC players
San Jose Earthquakes (1974–1988) players
FC Linz players
Nørresundby FB players
Danish expatriate footballers
Danish expatriate sportspeople in Austria
Danish expatriate sportspeople in the United States
Danish expatriate sportspeople in West Germany
Expatriate footballers in West Germany
Expatriate soccer players in the United States
Expatriate footballers in Austria